EBM may stand for:
 El Borma Airport, in Tunisia
 Electron-beam machining
 Electron-beam melting
 Electronic ballot marker
 Electronic body music, an electronic music genre
 Elektra Birseck Münchenstein, a Swiss energy company
 English Biscuit Manufacturers, a Pakistani biscuit manufacturer
 Espresso Book Machine, a print-on-demand machine
 Evidence-based medicine, an approach to medical research and practice
 Swedish Economic Crime Authority
 Écoles Belges au Maroc, Belgian international schools in Morocco
 EBM (album), a 2022 album by British indie rock band Editors

Ebm may stand for:
 E-flat minor (Em)